Marcher dans le sable is a 2000 album recorded by French singer Gérald De Palmas. It was his third studio album, and his most successful in terms of sales. It reached number two in France and in Belgium (Wallonia) and remained for almost two years on the chart. The album was awarded 'French album of the year' at the 2002 NRJ Music Awards and allowed De Palmas to win a Victoire de la Musique, the same year, in the category 'Male group or artist of the year'. It provided three singles : "J'en rêve encore" was the most successful (#7 in France, No. 4 in Belgium Wallonia), followed by the two moderate hits "Une seule vie (marcher dans le sable)" and "Tomber" (respectively No. 30 and No. 35 in France).

Track listing
 "Une seule vie (marcher dans le sable)" De Palmas – 3:07
 "J'en rêve encore" De Palmas / Jean-Jacques Goldman – 4:01
 "Tomber" De Palmas / Maxime Le Forestier – 3:22
 "Regarde-moi bien en face" De Palmas – 3:21
 "Tellement" De Palmas – 3:49
 "Tu finiras toute seule" De Palmas – 3:35
 "Rien à faire ensemble" De Palmas – 3:36
 "Déjà" De Palmas – 3:21
 "Je te pardonne" De Palmas – 3:05
 "Le gouffre" De Palmas / Nativel – 2:38
 "Trop tard" De Palmas – 3:35
 "Si tu veux" De Palmas – 4:48
 "Déjà" (acoustic) De Palmas – 6:19
+ Bonus 
 DVD
 "J'en rêve encore"
 "Une seule vie (marcher dans le sable)"
 "Tomber"

Source : Allmusic.

Credits and personnel
 Acoustic guitar, dobro, arranger, programming, vocals : Gerald De Palmas
 Bass : Bernard Viguie and Gerald De Palmas
 Keyboards : David Berland, Gérald de Palmas and Pete Gordeno
 Drums : Amaury Blanchard
 Electric guitar : Pascal B. Carmen and Sébastien Chouard
 Musical direction : Chiquito
 Photography : Bernard Benant

Release history

Certifications and sales

Charts

Weekly charts

Year-end charts

References

2000 albums
Gérald de Palmas albums